

See also

 Education in Uganda
 List of universities in Uganda
 List of law schools in Uganda
 List of medical schools in Uganda
 List of business schools in Uganda

References

External links
 Website of Uganda National Council for Higher Education

Leaders
Uganda
Vice-chancellors of universities in Uganda